Arto Tunçboyacıyan (born August 4, 1957) is a United States-based avant-garde folk and jazz multi-instrumentalist and singer of Armenian descent. He fronts his own group called the Armenian Navy Band, and is also a member of the instrumental quartet Night Ark. 

Tunçboyacıyan had appeared on more than 200 records in Europe before arriving in the United States, where he went on to work with numerous jazz musicians including Chet Baker, Marc Johnson, Al Di Meola, and Joe Zawinul, as well as performing semi-regularly with Paul Winter and the Earth Band. He has worked with Turkish singer Sezen Aksu and the Greek singer Eleftheria Arvanitaki. Tunçboyacıyan's elder brother Onno Tunç was also a musician, and they have collaborated on several occasions.

Early life
Arto Tunçboyacıyan was born in Istanbul, Turkey His father was a shoemaker of Armenian descent. 

At the age of 11, he began his career playing and recording traditional Anatolian music with various musicians, including his brother Onno Tunç, thus establishing himself as a professional musician throughout Turkey and Europe.

In 1981, Tunçboyacıyan moved to the United States and settled in New York.

Career
Arto started an association with Armenian-American oud player Ara Dinkjian. In 1985, the quartet Night Ark was founded and led by Ara Dinkjian. Arto recorded the duo project with Ara Dinkjian "Tears of Dignity" (1994) and "Onno" (1996) homage to his brother Onno who died in a plane crash in 1996. 

In 1988, his solo albums Virginland and Main Root were released. In 1997 Aile Muhabbeti was released in Turkey and used as a movie soundtrack. He composed the songs with Armenian and Turkish musicians. In 2000 he released Every Day is a New Life.

In 1998, Tunçboyacıyan returned to the Yerevan, the capital of Armenia, and met pianist and keyboardist Vahagn Hayrapetyan. They soon organised a rehearsal in order to recruit musicians to start a band. Ten local musicians were enlisted, thus becoming the Armenian Navy Band.

Some months later, in 1999, the band recorded their first album, called Bzdik Zinvor, in Yerevan. The recording was followed by their first European tour in 2000, in Italy, Germany, Austria and Spain. The band then performed concerts in France, Belgium and the Netherlands. During a 2001 stop in Istanbul, the Armenian Navy Band recorded their second album, New Apricot, in 2001. 

Armenian Navy Band's next album was Türkçe Sözlü Hafif Anadolu Müziği, recorded in the winter of 2001.

Tunçboyacıyan's 2001 album Aile Muhabbeti was used as soundtrack in two films: Hemşo (2001) and Mon père est ingénieur (2004).

The 2003 album Serart is a collaboration with Serj Tankian of System of a Down. They found common ground in shared Armenian backgrounds and a passion for sonic explorations in creating music that is claimed to be "completely new."

In the fall of 2003, a new project was born in a Yerevan studio. It was the beginning of a large sound project called "Sound of Our Life – Part One: Natural Seeds". The project was put together by Arto and the Armenian Navy Band, who joined their talents one more time in the fall of 2006 for Part Two.  They are hourlong compositions for the ANB and choir and string orchestras.

In 2004, Tunçboyacıyan opened the ANB Avant-garde Folk Music Club in Yerevan. In 2006, the Armenian Navy Band was nominated for Best Band of Europe and the Audience Award at the 2006 BBC World Music Awards.

There is a hidden track on the album Toxicity by System of a Down where Arto contributed with the band to a traditional Armenian Church hymn, "Der Voghormya (Lord Have Mercy)". He played the instrumental part of "Science" on the same album, and his voice can be heard in the interlude of "Bubbles" from Steal This Album!

In 2007 he formed the group Yash-Ar with fellow Turkish-Armenian rock artist Yaşar Kurt. Yash-Ar is made up of first part of his and Yaşar Kurt's first names.

In February 2011, Arto Tunçboyacıyan, as a band-member of The Paul Winter Consort, won the Grammy for Best New Age Album for Miho: Journey to the Mountain.

Armenian Navy Band
The Armenian Navy Band lineup varies from traditional (duduk, zurna, kemanche, kanun) to contemporary (trombone, alto sax, tenor, soprano sax, trumpet, bass, drums, keyboard and piano) instrumentation. The band plays a mixture of adapted and modern Armenian folk music. (Note that, being landlocked, the country of Armenia has no navy.)

Arto Tunçboyacıyan (percussion, vocals, bular)
Anahit Artushyan (kanun)
Armen Ayvazyan (kemanche)
Armen Hyusnunts (tenor and soprano saxophone)
Ashot Harutiunyan (trombone)
David Nalchajyan (alto saxophone)
Tigran Suchyan (trumpet)
Norayr Kartashyan (blul, duduk, zurna)
Vardan Grigoryan (duduk, zurna)
Arman Jalalyan (drums)
Vahagn Hayrapetyan (piano, keyboards)
Artyom Manukyan (bass, cello)
Vardan Arakelyan (bass)
Gagik Khodavirdi (guitar)
Vahram Davtyan (trombone)

Discography

Solo

Armenian Navy Band

Night Ark

Yash-Ar
 Nefrete Kine Karşı (Arma Music, 2009)

As sideman
With Ron Getz
Ego State (Alithea Records, 1988)

With Arthur Blythe
Night Song (Clarity, 1997)

With Al Di Meola
 World Sinfonia (Tomato, 1991)
 World Sinfonia II – Heart of the Immigrants (Tomato, 1993)
 World Sinfonía III – The Grande Passion (Telarc, 2000)

With Human Element
 Human Element (Abstract Logix, 2011)
 You Are In You (Human Element Music, 2018)

With Marc Johnson & Right Brain Patrol
 Right Brain Patrol (JMT, 1991)
 Magic Labyrinth (JMT, 1995)

With Paul Motian & Simon Nabatov
 Circle the Line (GM, 1986)

With Hank Roberts
 Little Motor People (JMT, 1993)

With Paul Winter & The Earth Band
 Journey With The Sun (Living Music, 2000)

Other appearances

Filmography

 2017: Nice Evening (Լավ Երեկո), special guest, as himself

Awards 
 Armenian Music Award (2002) 
 World Music Award (2006)
 Armenian Music Award (2007)
 Grammy (2011)

References

External links
 Official website of Arto Tuncboyaciyan
 Official website of Armenian Navy Band
 Arto Tuncboyacian and Armenian Navy Band concert in Moscow 19 May 2012 
 Arto on SOADfans
 Arto & ANB on BBC website
 Armenian Navy Band on Armenian Jazz

1957 births
Living people
Turkish people of Armenian descent
Musicians from Istanbul
Avant-garde musicians
Jazz percussionists
Armenian folk musicians
Armenian jazz musicians
Armenian rock musicians
Turkish folk musicians
Turkish jazz musicians
Turkish rock musicians
Honored artists of Armenia
The Zawinul Syndicate members
System of a Down